The 1985 1000 km Brands Hatch was the eighth round of the 1985 World Endurance Championship.  It took place at Brands Hatch, United Kingdom on September 22, 1985.

As a non-points race for the Teams Championship, and amid concerns over the design of the Porsche 956 in the wake of the death of Stefan Bellof three weeks prior, every Porsche customer team chose not to enter the event, leaving just the factory Rothmans team as the only Porsche entrant

Official results
Class winners in bold.  Cars failing to complete 75% of the winner's distance marked as Not Classified (NC).

Statistics
 Pole Position - #4 Martini Racing - 1:14.66
 Fastest Lap - #5 Martini Racing - 1:19.11
 Average Speed - 179.600 km/h

References

 
 

Brands Hatch
Brands Hatch